Alga (Alğa) is a rural locality (a village) in Maximovksky Selsoviet, Sterlitamaksky District, Bashkortostan, Russia. The population was 206 as of 2010. There are 2 streets.

Geography 
Alga is located 56 km west of Sterlitamak (the district's administrative centre) by road. Latypovka is the nearest rural locality.

References 

Rural localities in Sterlitamaksky District